Stuart Ross Taylor  (26 November 1925 – 23 May 2021) was a New Zealand geochemist and planetary scientist known for his studies of the geology of the Moon through lunar samples, the continental crust, tektites and the evolution of the Solar System. He was an emeritus professor and Visiting Fellow at the Australian National University in Canberra. He died in Canberra on 23 May 2021 at the age of 95.

Honours and awards
 5670 Rosstaylor, a main-belt asteroid discovered in 1985.
 Shoemaker Distinguished Lunar Scientist Award, 2012

Further reading
 
 Taylor, Stuart Ross (Ross) – Biographical entry in Encyclopedia of Australian Science

References

1925 births
2021 deaths
New Zealand geochemists
Academic staff of the Australian National University
People from Ashburton, New Zealand
University of Canterbury alumni
Indiana University alumni
Honorary Companions of the Order of Australia
Fellows of the Australian Academy of Science
Foreign associates of the National Academy of Sciences
New Zealand expatriates in Australia
Recipients of the V. M. Goldschmidt Award